Bonhomme Richard or Bon Homme Richard, meaning good man Richard in French, may refer to:

 , several ships of the United States.
 Les Maximes du Bonhomme Richard, the French title of Poor Richard's Almanack, for which the ships were named.
 A pseudonym of Benjamin Franklin

See also
 Bonhomme (disambiguation)
 Richard